Apilkin (fl. late 3rd millennium BCE) was the 11th Gutian ruler of the Gutian Dynasty of Sumer mentioned on the Sumerian King List (SKL). According to the SKL, Apilkin was the successor of Kurum and was succeeded by La-erabum.

See also

 History of Sumer
 List of Mesopotamian dynasties

References

Gutian dynasty of Sumer